The 2013 Internationaux Féminins de la Vienne was a professional tennis tournament played on indoor hard courts. It was the seventeenth edition of the tournament which was part of the 2013 ITF Women's Circuit, offering a total of $100,000 in prize money. It took place in Poitiers, France, on 21–27 October 2013.

WTA entrants

Seeds 

 1 Rankings as of 14 October 2013

Other entrants 
The following players received wildcards into the singles main draw:
  Julie Coin
  Stéphanie Foretz Gacon
  Pauline Parmentier
  Tamira Paszek

The following players received entry from the qualifying draw:
  Kateryna Kozlova
  Nicole Melichar
  Aliaksandra Sasnovich
  Daniela Seguel

The following players received entry as lucky losers into the singles main draw:
  Stéphanie Dubois
  Teodora Mirčić

The following player received entry by a protected ranking:
  Michaëlla Krajicek

Champions

Singles 

  Aliaksandra Sasnovich def.  Sofia Arvidsson 6–1, 5–7, 6–4

Doubles 

  Lucie Hradecká /  Michaëlla Krajicek def.  Christina McHale /  Monica Niculescu 7–6(7–5), 6–2

External links 
 2013 Internationaux Féminins de la Vienne at ITFtennis.com
 Official website 

2013 ITF Women's Circuit
2013 in French tennis
2013